Alhaji Mohammed Ahmed, called Mohammed Polo and popularly known as the "Dribbling Magician", is a former Ghanaian international football player and arguably the most technically gifted player ever to emerge from Ghana. He was in the Ghana squad that won the 1978 African Cup of Nations held in Ghana. He was a left winger and played for Hearts of Oak in the Ghana premier league.

Playing career
Polo played youth football with Auroras in Accra before signing for Hearts of Oak. Along with Mama Acquah, Anas Seidu, Peter Lamptey and Robert Hammond, they were known as the “Fearsome Five” and formed the backbone of the team. He was invited into the Black Stars at the age of 17 years. He also once played for Great Olympics football club, also in Accra. Mohammad Polo has also played in the 1980s for the famous Dubai Club, Al Wasl where the fans bonded with him and his skills instantly, and still remember the magic 20 years after his departure. Polo still visits Dubai and Al Wasl every now and then, and is seen wearing its yellow shirt in Ghana.

After playing career
He was appointed the Technical head of Great Olympics in January 2004.

Mohammed Polo owns the soccer academy Golden Stars Academy, which trains at Legon.

He considers himself a better player than Lionel Messi.

Polo is a former Head coach of the Ghana Premier League club Accra Hearts of Oak.

Personal life 
His mother was known as Hajia Hawa Ahmed.

Honours
1978 African Cup of Nations - champions
Footballer of the year - Ghana Football Association (1975)
African Player of the Year 1977 - Came 4th in voting for this award
UAE League Champion 1981–82, 1982–83
2006 - Coca-Cola Award on Breaking Barriers

Notes and references

External links

 Mohammed Ahmed Polo Biography

Living people
1956 births
Accra Hearts of Oak S.C. players
Ghana international footballers
Ghanaian Muslims
Ghanaian footballers
Ghanaian expatriate footballers
Al-Wasl F.C. players
Sekondi Hasaacas F.C. players
1978 African Cup of Nations players
1984 African Cup of Nations players
Africa Cup of Nations-winning players
UAE Pro League players
Association football midfielders
Accra Hearts of Oak S.C. managers
Ghanaian football managers
Expatriate footballers in the United Arab Emirates
Ghanaian expatriate sportspeople in the United Arab Emirates